The Mobile Broadband Alliance is a consortium of companies that have aligned to promote hardware with built-in HSPA broadband.

The companies include the mobile operators Vodafone, Orange, Telefónica Europe, T-Mobile, 3Group, Telecom Italia and TeliaSonera, and the hardware manufacturers Dell, Asus, Toshiba, Lenovo, Qualcomm, Ericsson, Gemalto, and ECS.

References
Big names flock to HSPA mobile broadband
Industry Giants Unite to Deliver Mobile Broadband Future
Mobile Broadband ~ GSM World

Broadband